Anatolii Alekseevich Mokrousov 'Мокроусов Анатолій Олексійович' (14 April 1943 – 9 January 2021) was a Ukrainian politician.  He graduated from 
Kyiv National University of Technologies and Design (1970); a member of the Communist Party of Ukraine, he served as a member of the Verkhovna Rada from 1990 until 2006.

Mokrousov died from COVID-19 on 9 January 2021, aged 77.

References

1943 births
2021 deaths
Deaths from the COVID-19 pandemic in Ukraine
First convocation members of the Verkhovna Rada
Second convocation members of the Verkhovna Rada
Third convocation members of the Verkhovna Rada
Fourth convocation members of the Verkhovna Rada
Communist Party of Ukraine politicians
Recipients of the Honorary Diploma of the Cabinet of Ministers of Ukraine